Binoli is a small town in the Almora district in the state of Uttarakhand, India.

The population of Binoli is approximately 870 people. Majority of Bohra Rajput Hindu caste live in Binoli . People in this region mainly practice subsistence farming  . There is one Golu devta mandir in Binoli village. It is Located at the top of the Mountain. Structures dating back to medivial period still exist in this region mostly in dilapidated state . It falls in the salt constituency of Rajya Sabha, Almora district
Binoli continues to attract tourists based on its traditional Hindu temples, the natural environment of the region, and views of the Himalayas. The Bohra community in this region is orthodox and, according to some accounts, it set the regions of Dharchula inhabiting Kanjars as well as Rawats to fire over some dispute. . The population of this village is now declining due to migrations to plains.

Demographics

References
 http://villages.euttaranchal.com/Almora/BhikiaSain/Quairala/Binoli/09010450

 https://web.archive.org/web/20090107005137/http://www.almoraonline.com/hindex.htm

 https://web.archive.org/web/20090410070305/http://almora.nic.in/btemples.htm

 https://web.archive.org/web/20090410070134/http://almora.nic.in/bvisitor.htm

External links
 http://almora.nic.in/

Cities and towns in Almora district